Mary Aiken is a Professor of cyberpsychology. Her book The Cyber Effect investigates the relationship between technology and human behaviour.

Education 
She received a Masters in Science in cyberpsychology and a Doctor of Philosophy in Forensic Cyberpsychology.

Career 

She is an academic advisor to Europol's European Cybercrime Centre (EC3)  and an Associate Professor in the Department of Law and Criminology at the University of East London (UEL) and an adviser to hedge fund the Paladin Capital Group.

She is a fellow of the Royal Society of Medicine, a fellow of the Society for Chartered IT Professionals, and a Global fellow at Wilson Center

Author 
On 18 August 2016, Aiken published her book The Cyber Effect. This book investigates the relationship between technology and human behaviour. The book received the award of "Book of the Year" in the "Thought Category" by the Times, along with "Science pick" by Nature.

Popular culture 
Aiken was the inspiration for the lead character, played by Patricia Arquette, in CSI: Cyber.

Achievements 

She was inducted into the Infosecurity Europe Hall of Fame. In 2022, she was awarded the freedom of Dublin city.

References

External links 
 
 maryaiken.com - personal website

Living people
Year of birth missing (living people)
Place of birth missing (living people)

Academics of the University of East London
Fellows of the Royal Society of Medicine
21st-century Irish non-fiction writers